Abu Nasr Isma'il ibn Hammad al-Jawhari also spelled al-Jauhari (died 1002 or 1008) was a medieval Turkic lexicographer and the author of a notable Arabic dictionary al-Ṣiḥāḥ fī al-lughah.

Life
He was born in the city of Farab (Otrar) in Transoxiana (in today's southern Kazakhstan). He began his studies of the Arabic language in Farab, then studied in Baghdad, continuing among the Arabs of the Hejaz, then moving to northern Khurāsān, first to Damghan before settling finally at Nishapur). It was here he met his death in a failed attempt at flight from the roof of a mosque, possibly due to delusions of being a bird.

Works
Taj al-Lugha wa Sihah al-Arabiya  "The Crown of Language and the Correct Arabic" - His magnum opus dictionary of Arabic;   often abbreviated as al-Sihah fi al-Lugha, "The Correct Language", and al-Sihah. It contains about 40,000 dictionary entries. Written in Nishapur, it was incomplete at his death and completed by a student. Al-Jawhari uses an alphabetical ordering system with the last letter of a word's root being the first ordering criterion. Al-Sihah is a principal Arabic dictionary of the medieval era and later compilers of Arabic dictionaries incorporated  its material. Over the centuries several abridgements and elaborations in Arabic were produced and a large portion was copied into the huge 13th century dictionary compilation Lisan al-Arab; published online at http://www.baheth.info. A fully searchable online edition available at Baheth.info.
edition begun by E. Scheidius with a Latin translation, but one part only appeared at Harderwijk (1776)
Complete edition, Tabriz (1854)
Complete edition, Cairo (1865)
many abridged and Persian language editions.

In 1729 Ibrahim Muteferrika's Arabic-Turkish dictionary, based on Jawhari's, became the  first book printed by printing press of Ottoman era.

References

Bibliography 

 Book Arabic Lexicography: Its History, and Its Place in the General History of Lexicography, by John A. Haywood, year 1965.

External links
 Encyclopedia Islamica

10th-century births
1000s deaths
Arabists
10th-century Turkic people
Lexicographers of Arabic
Grammarians of Arabic
Inventors killed by their own invention
10th-century Arabic writers